Lazarus Muoka is a Nigerian pastor, minister and author. He is the founder and General Overseer of The Lord's Chosen Charismatic Revival Movement.

Growing up and career
Lazarus Muoka was born into a Catholic family in Umuhu-Okabia in Orsu LGA of Orlu zone in Imo State where he went on to finish his primary and secondary school education. In 1975, he moved into Lagos and worked for some time under a company before starting up his own business which he did until he gave his life to Christ as a full Christian.

Lazarus Muoka claimed to have had many dreams from God in 1994 prompting him to pull out from the church he was serving as a pastor and set up his own church. Shortly after pulling out, he set up The Lord's Chosen Charismatic Revival Movement with the aim of "preaching the undiluted word of God". The church which started with a few pioneer members has gone on to become one of the most popular churches in Nigeria.

Publications
Apart from being a pastor, Lazarus is also a renowned author of Christian books and journals. Few of his published books include:
 How God Called Me
 "Mark My Words"
 "And Ye Shall Receive Power"
 "Ye Must Be Born Again"
 Christianity: A Better and Pure Religion

Criticism and controversy
Critics have criticized the miracles performed by Lazarus Muoka as "stage-managed" and "fake". A former member of his church claimed Lazarus shortchanged him of ₦317million after making an unwritten agreement with Lazarus to invest in the church. There were also many allegations leveled against him by a woman who went on to record and sell such allegations in C.D formats in major markets in Lagos and some parts of Nigeria. The management of the church denied such allegations as "baseless" and "untrue".

See also
 List of pastors in Nigeria

References

Nigerian Christian clergy
Year of birth missing (living people)
Living people
People from Imo State
Nigerian Christian writers
Nigerian Pentecostal pastors
Converts to evangelical Christianity from Roman Catholicism
Faith healers